Rum is a 2017 Indian Tamil language horror comedy thriller film written and directed by Sai Bharath. Featuring Hrishikesh, Vivek, Narain, Sanchita Shetty and Miya in the lead roles, the film's score and soundtrack is composed by Anirudh Ravichander. The film began production during early 2016 and was released on 17 February 2017.

Plot
Film starts with Shiva and his gang visits a bungalow. They experience spooky incidents in the haunted bungalow.

Cast

Production
The film began pre-production works during October 2015, with composer Anirudh Ravichander revealing that he would work on a film titled Rum directed by Sai Bharath and starring his cousin, Hrishikesh, in the lead role. The project was announced to be funded by All in Pictures, while the director stated that it would be a "horror-heist film". After completing a course in filmmaking in Canada, Sai Bharath had finished the script three years prior to the beginning of the shoot. He had approached Hrishikesh, who was looking to appear in his first lead role, after playing a supporting role in Velaiilla Pattadhari (2014). In February 2016, the film's first look poster was unveiled, with Sanchita Shetty and Miya revealed as the film's lead actresses. Narain, Vivek and Amzath Khan were also announced to be playing supporting roles in the film. The title Rum was revealed by the makers to be an ancient Tamil word meaning "verdict", rather than the alcohol as widely presumed. The shoot of the film began in February 2016 in Chennai and was finished by June 2016. During May 2016, the team shot for a fast-paced gaana song titled "Peiyo Phobilia" in a dense forest in Padappai and set up a campsite on location. The final schedule for the film began on 1 June 2016 and carried on for fifteen days until completion.

Soundtrack

The film's music was composed by Anirudh Ravichander, while the audio rights of the film was acquired by Sony Music. The album released on 2 November 2016 at an event held at Park Hyatt, Chennai with the lead cast and crew in attendance. Prior to the release of the album, a single track titled "Hola Amigo" was released in April 2016. Anirudh collaborated with Malaysian rapper Balan Kashmir for the song which carried the theme of intolerance, and the song subsequently went viral on social media after it was promoted by American DJ Diplo. A second single, "Peiyophobilia", was also released in September 2016 and featured vocals by actor Silambarasan, who collaborated on a film soundtrack with Anirudh for the first time. Behindwoods.com stated "Rum is an EDM intoxicant from Anirudh, which is addictive".

Release
Originally produced by Vijay Raghavendra, the film’s Tamil Nadu theatrical rights were sold to Shri Sai Circuit 6000, with the makers releasing the film in 150 screens across Tamil Nadu. Upon release, the film received a positive review from The New Indian Express, with the critic stating "in the first half, both horror and humour have worked out well", "in the second half that the plot loses steam" but "it peps up again towards the end". In contrast, Baradwaj Rangan of The Hindu wrote "Rum feels incoherent, and you wonder if it’s because the director was trying to be avant-garde, or whether he just ran out of film", stating that "the film has no spirit". A reviewer from Sify.com stated "Rum is an average horror comedy" and that the "major problem with Rum is that technically the film is amateurish and delivers very little in terms of novelty". The reviewer added the film "has more laugh-out-loud moments than jump-in-your-seat jolts" and that "it is just dull, lazy film making from debutant director Sai Bharath". Behindwoods.com states it was "a horror comedy that has nothing new to offer", concluding that "the film lacks clarity and moves cluelessly in its initial moments".

References

External links
 

2017 films
2017 horror films
2010s heist films
2017 horror thriller films
2010s Tamil-language films
Films shot in Chennai
Indian heist films
Indian horror thriller films
Films scored by Anirudh Ravichander
2017 directorial debut films